Coleophora pallidata is a moth of the family Coleophoridae. It is found in Iran.

References

pallidata
Moths described in 1959
Insects of Iran
Moths of Asia